Chinophrys trifasciata is a jumping spider species in the genus Chinophrys that lives in South Africa. Only the male has been described.

References

Endemic fauna of South Africa
Salticidae
Spiders described in 2014
Spiders of South Africa
Taxa named by Wanda Wesołowska